Bryelmis is a genus of riffle beetles in the family Elmidae. There are at least three described species in Bryelmis.

Species
These three species belong to the genus Bryelmis:
 Bryelmis idahoensis Barr, 2011
 Bryelmis rivularis Barr, 2011
 Bryelmis siskiyou Barr, 2011

References

Further reading

 
 
 
 
 

Elmidae
Articles created by Qbugbot